Poitiers is a city in France.

Poitiers may also refer to:

Places
 Roman Catholic Archdiocese of Poitiers, France
 Arrondissement of Poitiers, Vienne, Nouvelle-Aquitaine, France
 Canton of Poitiers (disambiguation)
 Grand Poitiers communauté urbaine, Vienne, Nouvelle-Aquitaine, France
 County of Poitiers, Aquitaine; a county that became the province of Pitou, France

Facilities and structures
 University of Poitiers, Poitiers, Pitou, France
 Poitiers Campus, Sciences Po
 Poitiers–Biard Airport, Pitou, France
 Poitiers Cathedral, Poitiers, Pitou, France
 Poitiers station, Poitiers, Pitou, France; a train station
 Palace of Poitiers, Poitiers, Pitou, France

People
 Bishop of Poitiers, a position in the Roman Catholic Church
 Count of Poitiers, a noble title of Aquitaine, France
 House of Poitiers, a noble house of Gaul, Aquitaine, France
 House of Poitiers-Lusignan, a noble house of Aquitaine with kingships in several Crusader kingdoms

Persons
 Abra of Poitiers (343–360), Saint Abra

 Saint Agnes of Poitiers (died 586)
 Agnes of Poitou of House Poitiers (1025–1077, also Agnes of Poitiers), Holy Roman Empress
 Aliénor de Poitiers (1444–1509), Burgundian courtier 
 Aymar VI de Poitiers (14th century), Count of Valentinois
 Diane de Poitiers (1500–1566), French noblewoman and courtier
 Ebroin of Poitiers (died 850), bishop and administrator of Poitiers
 Gilbert of Poitiers (1085–1154), theologian and logician
 Henry of Poitiers (1217–1217), Bailiff of the Kingdom of Jerusalem
 Hildegar of Poitiers (12th century), physician and mathematician
 Hilary of Poitiers (310–367), Bishop of Poitiers
 Hugh of Poitiers (died 1167), Benedictine monk and chronicler
 Jean de Poitiers (1475–1539), French nobleman
 John of Poitiers (died 1204), Roman Catholic prelate
 John of Poitiers-Lusignan (died 1343), Regent of the Kingdom of Cillicia
 Louis of Poitiers (disambiguation)
 Peter of Poitiers (1130–1215), theologian
 Peter of Poitiers (secretary) (12th century), monk and translator scribe
 Philip of Poitiers (disambiguation)
 Radegund of Poitiers (520–587), Thuringian princess and Frankish queen
 Raymond of Poitiers (1105–1149), Prince of Antioch
 Richard of Poitiers (died 1174), Benedictine monk and author
 William of Poitiers (disambiguation)

Military
 Battle of Vouillé (507; also called "Battle of Poitiers"), between the Franks and the Visigoths
 Battle of Tours-Poitiers (732; also called "Battle of Poitiers"), in the Umayyad Invasion of Gaul
 Battle of Poitiers (1356), in the Hundred Years War between England and France
 Siege of Poitiers (1569), French Wars of Religion

Other uses
 First Edict of Poitiers (1573), a treaty that ended the first of the Wars of Religion in France
 Edict of Poitiers (1577), a treaty between France and Huguenot princes
 FC Poitiers, Poitiers, France; a soccer team

See also

 La Séquestrée de Poitiers (1849–1913), an adult woman kidnapped and confined by her mother
 
 Poitier (surname)
 Poitou (disambiguation)